Otter Lake is a village in the U.S. state of Michigan. Approximately half of the village lies in Marathon Township in Lapeer County and half in Forest Township in Genesee County. The population was 389 at the 2010 census. The village is named after the nearby body of water which had numerous otters.

History
Otter Lake was first settled in 1838 by Andrew McArthur. The Otter Lake post office opened on February 12, 1873 with postmaster John M. McDonald. In 1874, Page & Benson pine lumber company platted the community. That same year, the Pere Marquette Railroad came through.

The Village of Otter Lake was incorporated in 1883.

Geography

Demographics

2010 census
As of the census of 2010, there were 389 people, 144 households, and 99 families living in the village. The racial makeup of the village was 94.3% White, 0.3% African American, 1.3% Native American, 0.3% Asian, 0.3% Pacific Islander, 0.3% from other races, and 3.3% from two or more races. Hispanic or Latino of any race were 1.8% of the population.

There were 144 households, of which 31.3% had children under the age of 18 living with them, 47.9% were married couples living together, 13.2% had a female householder with no husband present, 7.6% had a male householder with no wife present, and 31.3% were non-families. 25.0% of all households were made up of individuals, and 7.7% had someone living alone who was 65 years of age or older. The average household size was 2.70 and the average family size was 3.21.

The median age in the village was 38.4 years. 25.7% of residents were under the age of 18; 8.7% were between the ages of 18 and 24; 24.4% were from 25 to 44; 29.6% were from 45 to 64; and 11.6% were 65 years of age or older. The gender makeup of the village was 54.8% male and 45.2% female.

2000 census
As of the census of 2000, there were 437 people, 154 households, and 117 families living in the village. The racial makeup of the village was 97.25% White, 1.14% Native American, and 1.60% from two or more races. Hispanic or Latino of any race were 2.75% of the population.

There were 154 households, out of which 33.1% had children under the age of 18 living with them, 56.5% were married couples living together, 13.6% had a female householder with no husband present, and 24.0% were non-families. 17.5% of all households were made up of individuals, and 5.2% had someone living alone who was 65 years of age or older.  The average household size was 2.84 and the average family size was 3.18.

In the village, the population was spread out, with 29.7% under the age of 18, 8.0% from 18 to 24, 30.7% from 25 to 44, 19.7% from 45 to 64, and 11.9% who were 65 years of age or older.  The median age was 32 years. For every 100 females, there were 100.5 males.  For every 100 females age 18 and over, there were 100.7 males.

The median income for a household in the village was $49,000, and the median income for a family was $49,167. Males had a median income of $32,024 versus $30,833 for females. The per capita income for the village was $17,927.  About 6.7% of families and 7.8% of the population were below the poverty line, including 8.9% of those under age 18 and none of those age 65 or over.

References

Notes

Sources

External links
Otter Lake Village Home Page

Villages in Lapeer County, Michigan
Villages in Genesee County, Michigan
Villages in Michigan